Discover is a credit card brand issued primarily in the United States. It was introduced by Sears in 1985. When launched, Discover did not charge an annual fee and offered a higher-than-normal credit limit, features that were disruptive to the existing credit card industry. A subsequent innovation was "Cashback Bonus" on purchases.

Most cards with the Discover brand are issued by Discover Bank, formerly the Greenwood Trust Company.  Discover transactions are processed through the Discover Network payment network. In 2005, Discover Financial Services acquired Pulse, an electronic funds transfer network, allowing it to market and issue debit and ATM cards. In February 2006, Discover Financial Services announced that it would begin offering Discover debit cards to other financial institutions, made possible by the acquisition of Pulse.

Discover is the third largest credit card brand in the U.S. based on the number of cards in circulation, behind Visa and Mastercard, with 57 million cardholders.

History 
At the time Discover was introduced, Sears was the largest retailer in the United States. It had purchased the Dean Witter Reynolds brokerage organization and Coldwell, Banker & Company (real estate) in 1981 as an attempt to add financial services to its portfolio of customer services. Ray Kennedy, Sr, father of country singer Ray Kennedy and the credit manager for Sears, conceived the card. After a trial period in 1985, starting with a $26.77 purchase at an Atlanta Sears on September 17, the actual launch was pushed through by Philip J. Purcell and Mitchell M. Merin, the company's senior vice president for corporate administration and manager of financial analysis, respectively. Together with the Discover Card (and its issuing bank, the Greenwood Trust Company, owned by Sears), this was named the Sears Financial Network. Early Discover Cards bore a small embossed symbol representing the Sears Tower, then the company's headquarters.

Discover was part of Dean Witter, and then Morgan Stanley, until 2007, when Discover Financial Services became an independent company. Novus was once the major processing center that partnered with the company. The Novus logo was retired, replaced by the Discover Network logo.

Unlike other attempts at creating a credit card to rival MasterCard and Visa, such as Citibank's Choice card, Discover gained a large national consumer base. It carried no annual fee, which was uncommon at the time, and offered a typically higher credit limit than similar cards. Cardholders could also earn a "Cashback Bonus", in which a percentage of the amount spent would be refunded to the account (from 1% to 5%), depending on how much the card was used. Discover was also noteworthy for being the only credit card accepted by the U.S. Customs Service to pay customs duty, effective February 19, 1987. Since it did not charge a percentage fee to retailers, unlike Visa, MasterCard, and American Express, Discover was also the only credit card accepted at Sam's Club; the retailer has since started to accept MasterCard and American Express (see below). A 1989 study found that Discover had strong consumer adoption in the U.S.; the number of households with Discover cards increased by 2.1 million, or 14 percent, in 1989. In this same year, Discover also signed a restaurant in Delaware as its 1 millionth merchant in its payment network.

The plan to create a one-stop financial-services center in Sears stores was not as successful as Sears had hoped, and its promotion of Discover was thought both to hurt Sears turnover and to restrict the card's potential. Other retailers resisted it, as they were developing their own credit products and they believed they would be helping their competitor. Sears began to face difficulties in the late 1980s in light of these developments, and with strong competition both from Walmart and from so-called category killers such as Toys "R" Us. Discover's introduction was costly; Sears's Discover credit card operations accounted for a loss of $22 million in the fourth quarter of 1986, and a loss of $25.8 million in the first quarter of 1987. Sears sold its financial businesses in 1993 and began to accept MasterCard and Visa in addition to its store credit card and Discover. Discover became part of the Dean Witter financial services firm, and the new company was called Dean Witter, Discover & Co. In 1997, this company merged with Morgan Stanley to become Morgan Stanley Dean Witter, Discover & Co. In 1999, this company rebranded itself as Discover Financial Services, Inc.

Discover Bank 
The Greenwood Trust Company was founded in 1911 and is based in Greenwood, Delaware. It was acquired by Discover Financial Services in 1985 and renamed Discover Bank in 2000. The first and original location of Greenwood Trust Co. on East Market Street is now the town hall and police station.

Global alliance 

Starting around 2005, to increase acceptance around the world, Discover has formed several agreements with other payment networks internationally. This allows Discover cardholders to perform transactions while traveling abroad. Vice versa, cardholders of other countries may utilize their cards at U.S. merchants that accept Discover. Some major examples include:
Diners Club International worldwide
 BC Card in South Korea
 JCB in Japan
 RuPay in India
 TROY in Turkey
 UnionPay in China
 Verve in Nigeria
 DinaCard in Serbia
 Elo in Brazil
 ATH in Puerto Rico
 Mercury throughout the Middle East
 NAPAS in Vietnam
 Prosa in Mexico

Currently, Discover is accepted in 185 countries.

Business developments 

In October 2004, the Supreme Court of the United States chose not to review a ruling in Discover's favor that challenged exclusionary policies of Visa and MasterCard, stating that MasterCard and Visa were violating antitrust regulations. Before this ruling, Visa and MasterCard would not allow banks to issue a Discover or American Express card if they issued a Visa or MasterCard. Within days of the court ruling, Discover filed a lawsuit in federal court seeking damages from Visa and MasterCard.

Shortly after the 2004 Supreme Court ruling, Discover struck its first deal to have its cards issued by another financial institution, GE Consumer Finance, which began to issue credit cards for retailer Walmart and its wholesale warehouse stores, Sam's Club. Transactions were processed on the Discover Network. Sam's Club exclusively accepted Discover for many years; since November 2006, it has also accepted MasterCard for purchases. In April 2014, Walmart announced that they were ending their relationship with Discover and would begin converting all Discover-branded cards to Mastercard beginning in June 2014.

HSBC has issued Discover-branded credit cards processed through the Discover Network since its acquisition of card issuer Metris in late 2005. Metris had originally signed an agreement with Discover in September 2005, three months prior to the HSBC acquisition.

In September 2012, Discover was ordered to pay over $200 million in fines and customer reimbursements to settle accusations by U.S. federal regulators that it had engaged in deceptive telemarketing tactics.

Advertising 

From 1998 to 2007, Discover Card owned a billboard at One Times Square, just above the flagpole where the Times Square Ball is placed, until Toshiba bought the space. As a result, its logo could be seen on national television during New Year's Eve, while the ball dropped. Discover also sponsored the ball drop itself.

From its opening in 2001 to 2012, Sugarloaf Mills Mall in Lawrenceville, Georgia, was named Discover Mills in a naming rights partnership with Discover Card. The slogan for the mall was "Where Discover Card is the Smart Choice". It was the first shopping mall to have granted naming rights to interested companies.

Since 2008, Discover has been the official credit-card partner of the National Hockey League. As part of this deal, Discover offers team- and league-branded credit cards as well as a 10% discount on purchases made from the NHL's online store using Discover.

In July 2020, Back in the Day Bakery, run by chef Cheryl Day, was a recipient of a $25,000 prize donated by Discover Card, to support black-owned businesses affected by the COVID-19 pandemic.

See also

References

External links 
 
 

Credit cards in the United States
Sears Holdings brands
Products introduced in 1985
Discover Financial